Over the Edge (2002) is a non-fiction book by American author Greg Child, chronicling the 2000 kidnapping of mountain climbers Beth Rodden, Tommy Caldwell, Jason "Singer" Smith, and John Dickey by Islamic guerrilla fighters in the mountains of Kyrgyzstan.

Publishers Weekly reviewed the book negatively, writing that "despite full access to the climbers after their escape and rescue, and despite background knowledge from his own climbs in the region, Child's story is flat." In American Alpine Journal, David Hale wrote "it is an incredible story, and Child does justice to the cool-headed heroism of all four Americans." A review in the Washington Post is critical of Child's financial agreement with the climbers — which it calls "checkbook journalism" — and his treatment of rival journalist John Bouchard.

References

2002 non-fiction books
Kyrgyzstan in fiction
Islamic terrorism in fiction